Aryee is a surname. Notable people with the surname include:

Ashiakwei Aryee (born 1976), Ghanaian boxer
Bernard Aryee (born 1973), Ghanaian footballer
Fred Aryee (born 1939), Nigerian footballer
Isaac Aryee (born 1941), Ghanaian politician
Joyce Aryee (born 1947), Ghanaian politician